Adolf Gehrts (30 October 1886 – 17 January 1943) was a German international footballer.

References

1886 births
1943 deaths
German footballers
Association football forwards
Germany international footballers
SC Victoria Hamburg players